The Exner function is an important parameter in atmospheric modeling. The Exner function can be viewed as non-dimensionalized pressure and can be defined as:
 

References 
Pielke, Roger A. Mesoscale Meteorological Modeling. Orlando: Academic Press, Inc., 1984.
U.S. Department of Commerce, National Oceanic and Atmospheric Administration, National Weather Service. National Weather Service Handbook No. 1 - Facsimile Products. Washington, DC: Department of Commerce, 1979.

See also 
Barometric formula
Climate model
Euler equations
Fluid dynamics
General circulation model
Numerical weather prediction
Primitive equations

Numerical climate and weather models